The Emir Abdelkader Mosque (Jemaa EL-Emir Abdelkader) is a mosque located in Constantine, the capital of  Constantine province, Algeria. It is the second largest mosque in Algeria after Djamaa Al Djazair.

Architecture 
The university and mosque were built with marbles and granite. It has two minarets that are 107m high and a Dome. The Mosque was completed and Inaugurated in 1994.

Gallery

See also

 Emir Abdelkader University
 Al Amir Abdelkader Ibn Mahyeddine

Reference

Mosques completed in 1994
Mosques in Constantine, Algeria
Sunni mosques
Sunni Islam in Algeria
1994 establishments in Algeria
20th-century religious buildings and structures in Algeria